Mountainville may refer to:

 Mountainville, New Jersey
 Mountainville, New York